The women's hammer throw event at the 2016 African Championships in Athletics was held on 22 June in Kings Park Stadium.

Results

References

2016 African Championships in Athletics
Hammer throw at the African Championships in Athletics
2016 in women's athletics